Ivalo Airport is an airport in Ivalo, Inari, Finland. It is the northernmost airport in Finland and in the European Union.

Airlines and destinations

Statistics

See also
List of the largest airports in the Nordic countries

References

External links

 Finavia – Ivalo Airport
 AIP Finland – Ivalo Airport
 
 
 

Airports in Finland
Sápmi
Airports in the Arctic
Inari, Finland
Buildings and structures in Lapland (Finland)
International airports in Finland